Children of the Force can refer to
 A Star Wars Tales comic
 A second-season episode of Star Wars: The Clone Wars (2008 series)